Tom Stade is a Canadian comedian who currently lives in Edinburgh, Scotland with his wife Trudy and their two children. Stade was encouraged to move from his hometown of Vancouver to the UK in 2001 by his friend and fellow comedian, Craig Campbell. He has a distinctive "drunken Canadian" accent and is known for his appearances at the Edinburgh Festival, as well as appearing on British TV shows such as Live at the Apollo, The Comedy Store, The Live Floor Show, Stand Up for the Week, and The World Stands Up. Other appearances include: Mock the Week, the Birmingham leg of (whilst he lived in Wolverhampton) Michael McIntyre's Comedy Roadshow, Dave's One Night Stand, Lee Mack's All Star Cast, and Frankie Boyle's Tramadol Nights (for which he also wrote). In March 2011 and December 2012, he appeared as a guest star on Soccer AM.

Stade appeared on Frankie Boyle's stand-up show The Boyle Variety Performance in August 2012, and recorded a live DVD at the Bloomsbury Theatre, London (released in autumn 2013). His 2013 UK tour show was called Totally Rocks.

References

External links

Living people
Year of birth missing (living people)
Canadian stand-up comedians
Canadian emigrants to Scotland
Comedians from Vancouver